Imam Hossein Square, or Meydan-e-Emam-Hoseyn, is a square in eastern central Tehran, Iran.

Transportation
  Enqelab Street
  Damavand Street
  17 Shahrivar Street
  Mazandaran Street
  Tehran BRT Line Imam Hossein Square Station
  Imam Hossein Metro Station

Former
The Tehran trolleybus system terminated at Meydan-e-Emam-Hoseyn (Imam Hossein Square) upon its opening in the early 1990s and as of 2005 all five routes of the system (routes 1–5) were still doing so.  However, routes 1 and 2 were discontinued sometime between 2005 and 2010, and the remaining routes serving Imam Hossein Square were cut back by about 1 km to Meydan-e-Shohada at an unknown date between 2011 and 2013.

References

Streets in Tehran